The Neuroscience Information Framework is a repository of global neuroscience web resources, including experimental, clinical, and translational neuroscience databases, knowledge bases, atlases, and genetic/genomic resources and provides many authoritative links throughout the neuroscience portal of Wikipedia.

Description

The Neuroscience Information Framework (NIF) is an initiative of the NIH Blueprint for Neuroscience Research, which was established in 2004 by the National Institutes of Health.

Development of the NIF started in 2008, when the University of California, San Diego School of Medicine obtained an NIH contract to create and maintain "a dynamic inventory of web-based neurosciences data, resources, and tools that scientists and students can access via any computer connected to the Internet". The project is headed by Maryann Martone, co-director of the National Center for Microscopy and Imaging Research (NCMIR), part of the multi-disciplinary Center for Research in Biological Systems (CRBS), headquartered at UC San Diego.  Together with co-principal investigators Jeffrey S. Grethe and Amarnath Gupta, Martone leads a national collaboration that includes researchers at Yale University, the California Institute of Technology, George Mason University, Harvard, and Washington University.

Goals

Unlike general search engines, NIF provides much deeper access to a focused set of resources that are relevant to neuroscience, search strategies tailored to neuroscience, and access to content that is traditionally “hidden” from web search engines.  The NIF is a dynamic inventory of neuroscience databases, annotated and integrated with a unified system of biomedical terminology (i.e. NeuroLex). NIF supports concept-based queries across multiple scales of biological structure and multiple levels of biological function, making it easier to search for and understand the results. NIF will  also provide a registry through which resources providers can disclose availability of resources relevant to neuroscience research. NIF is not intended to be a warehouse or repository itself, but a means for disclosing and locating resources elsewhere available via the web.

The NIFSTD, or NIF Standard Ontology contains many of the terms, synonyms and abbreviations useful for neuroscience, as well as dynamic categories such as defined cell classes based on various properties like neuron by neurotransmitter or by circuit role or drugs of abuse according to the National Institutes on Drug Abuse.
Any term (with associated synonyms) or dynamic category (all terms with their synonyms) can be used to simultaneously query all of the data that NIF currently indexes, please find several examples below:
available data about the hippocampus including synonyms
data about parkinson's disease including archaic synonyms like paralysis agitans
neocortical neuron a dynamic category includes all neurons that have cell soma in any part of the neocortex

Content
NIF content can be thought of as a Catalog (NIF Registry) and deep database search (NIF Data Federation)

 The NIF Catalog has the largest listing of NIH-funded, neuroscience-relevant resources, including scientific databases, software tools, experimental reagents and tools, knowledge bases and portals, and other entities identified by the neuroscience research community. 
A listing of current resources can be found at www.neuinfo.org/registry

 The NIF Data Federation searches deep database content of over 150 databases including: various NCBI databases (PubMed, Gensat, Entrez Gene, Homologene, GEO) as well as many large and small databases that have something to do with neuroscience including Gemma (microarray data from the nervous system), CCDB & CIL (images of neurons and astrocytes, mainly), GeneNetwork, AgingGenesDB, XNAT, 1000 Functional Connectomes. The 'complete' list (as of April 2013) can be found in the table below. An updated list can be found on the Data Federation page.
 In addition many databases that have very similar types of data have been integrated into 'virtual databases', which combine many databases into one table. For example, the AntibodyRegistry combines data from 200+ vendors, the NIF Integrated BrainGeneExpression combines gene expression data from Gensat, Alan Brain, and Mouse Genome Informatics, the Connectivity view combines six databases that have statements about nervous system connectivity, the Integrated Animal view combines data about experimental animal catalogs available to researchers from transgenic or inbred worms, zebrafish, mice and rats.  We add more of these as data are registered, so check back to this page to see the current contents.
 For an exhaustive and up to date list of Databases and Datasets registered to NIF please check this page www.neurolex.org. The table below was updated April 9, 2013.

Data Via Web Services
The idea of NIF is that while scientific databases do have a plethora of interfaces, some quite complex, there should be a uniform way of looking at them and searching though them. This uniform search idea has been extended to services so that developers can take advantage of the work done at NIF to enhance their own applications by gaining access to all of the data available through the NIF interface.

When data is made public via NIF, it also becomes immediately available via web services. These RESTful web services can be thought of as programming functions that can be built into other applications. Currently, the data can be queried and pulled as an XML feed and several other sites are now pulling NIF data via services, including DOMEO and Eagle i. Developers can learn how to access data by viewing the WADL file available at http://neuinfo.org/developers

Below are some public RESTful services that can be accessed by students or used in building applications:

 Annotate any text by using this url: 
   * http://nif-services.neuinfo.org/servicesv1/v1/annotate?content=The%20cerebellum%20is%20a%20wonderful%20thing&longestOnly=true
The url contains the text you want to annotate, the input, which is "The cerebellum is a wonderful thing". To change this you can try to use any other text.
The output from the service will return the sentence with a SPAN tag denoting that it recognized the term cerebellum and it is a type of anatomical_structure. The terms that are not recognized are returned without span tags. Note, the longestOnly=true parameter is optional it means that only the longest set of terms will be recognized an in this example it makes no difference, but in terms like hippocampal neuron it will only return one response.

Developers can use the span tags to bring back information about the recognized term because the identifier is unique and linked to definitions, synonyms, other brain regions and in some cases images:
For a human readable version see  
   * http://neurolex.org/wiki/Birnlex_1489 
For a machine readable version see 
   * http://nif-services.neuinfo.org/ontoquest/concepts/Birnlex_1489?get_super=true

 Retrieve neuroscience auto-complete suggestions, e.g., 
   * http://nif-services.neuinfo.org/servicesv1/v1/vocabulary?prefix=hippocampu

The above example shows the term completion for "hippocampu", but you can try to type on the url any other set of letters.
The return of the service is a set of terms that matches this string including: Hippocampus and many hippocampal cells.

 Retrieve the registry items that match a search term: 
   * http://nif-services.neuinfo.org/servicesv1/v1/federation/data/nlx_144509-1?q=miame

The NIF Registry is a data source and this service will return all items in the registry that match the particular search term. In this case the term is miame, as in the miame standard. To use this data retrieving function you can type query terms into the end of this url in addition to or instead of the term miame. This will work the same way as typing your terms into the search box here:
   * https://neuinfo.org/mynif/search.php?q=hippocampus&t=registry

Note, make sure to check the terms and conditions for any source of data, terms and conditions are available as a courtesy in NIF, but you may also check with the individual sources that you wish to incorporate in your applications, all of the above described data is owned by NIF and is covered under the Creative Commons Attribution license, so it can be freely distributed and shared.

Notes and references

See also

 NeuroLex
 NeuroNames

External links
 Neuroscience Information Framework (NIF) website
 NIF NeuroLex  - The Neuroscience Lexicon
 Neuroscience Information Framework News & Announcements
 Neuroscience Information Framework Facebook Page
 Neuroscience Information Framework Mendeley Group

Internet search engines
Neuroscience software
Neuroinformatics
Online databases
Ontology (information science)
Semantic Web
Anatomy websites
Biological databases